Avalanche Peak may refer to:

 Avalanche Peak (California)
 Avalanche Peak (Colorado)
 Avalanche Peak (India)
 Avalanche Peak (New Mexico)
 Avalanche Peak (New Zealand)
 Avalanche Peak (Wyoming)
 Avalanche Peak (Yukon)

See also
 Avalanche Mountain